2022–23 Belarusian Cup , known as the Parimatch-Belarus Cup for sponsorship purposes, is the thirty second season of the Belarusian annual cup competition. Contrary to the league season, it is conducted in a fall-spring rhythm. It started on 29 April 2022 and will culminate with a final match in May 2023. The winner of the cup will qualify for the second qualifying round of the 2023–24 UEFA Europa Conference League.

The defending champions are FC Gomel.

Preliminary round
75 clubs from the Belarusian Second League and lower regional leagues entered in this round, with Polotsk 2019 advancing directly to the first round. The draw was performed on 13 April 2022. The matches were played between 29 April and 11 May.

First round
38 clubs competed in this round.  18 matches took place with Polotsk 2019 and FC Zhlobin advancing directly to the second round. The draw was performed on 10 May 2022 at the House of Football. The matches were played on 14 and 15 May.

Second round
32 clubs competed in this round, including 12 teams from the First League entering the competition at this stage. The draw was performed on 18 May 2022 at the House of Football. The matches were played on 28 and 29 May.

Round of 32
32 clubs will compete in this round, the 16 winners from the second round and the 16 teams from the Belarusbank Major League, all of which enter the competition at this stage. Four teams from the Belarusian 2. Division remain in the tournament. The draw was performed on 31 May 2022 at the House of Football. The matches will be played 21–23 June.

Round of 16
The 16 winners from the second round, all from the Belarusbank Major League, compete in this stage. All teams from the from the Belarusian 1. Division and 2. Division have been eliminated. The draw was held on June 28 at the House of Football and matches are scheduled for 29 July.

Quarter-finals
The 8 winners from the second round, all from the Belarusbank Major League, compete in this stage.

2–2 on aggregate; FC Torpedo-BelAZ Zhodino won on penalties.

FC BATE Borisov won 10–0 on aggregate.

FC Neman Grodno won 2–1 on aggregate.

FC Slavia Mozyr won 2–1 on aggregate.

Semi-finals
The 4 winners from the second round, all from the Belarusbank Major League, compete in this stage.

References

External links
 Football.by

2022–23 European domestic association football cups
Cup
Cup
2022-23